KHDY-FM (98.5 FM) is a radio station licensed to Clarksville, Texas. KHDY-FM is owned by American Media Investments and airs a classic rock music format.

On February 4, 2019, KHDY-FM rebranded as "98.5 & 103.9 The Pig", simulcasting KPGG 103.9 FM Ashdown, Arkansas.

On January 4, 2021, KHDY split from its simulcast of sister station KPGG and began airing its own separate programming again, flipping from classic country to classic rock as "Classic Rock 98-5".

References

External links

HDY-FM
Classic country radio stations in the United States